Piran Coastal Galleries is a public institution, encompassing a group of six contemporary art galleries.  Three galleries are located in Piran, two of them in Koper, and one in Venice. The institution is the center of contemporary art in Slovenian Littoral, one of the four most influential art galleries in Slovenia, and the only one having an outpost abroad, in Venice. They present Slovenian as well as international contemporary artists, keep a rich art museum collection, publish art books and catalogues of exhibitions, and manage a library of modern art. The institution produces over one third of the countries entire gallery program.

Financing
The galleries spend approximately 750,000 euros annually. Four fifths of the sum are contributed by the state, which in 2010 was 5% of the state money earmarked for galleries.  106,000 euros were contributed by the Municipality of Piran, and 21,000 euros by the City Municipality of Koper. Starting from 2012, Koper has stopped financing the institution.

History and program

The institution was established in 1974, and opened its doors to the public in 1976. Approximately one half of its program is created in Koper, and one half in Piran. Each year, it organises art events, such as:
 Ex-Tempore Piran (International Painting and Ceramics Competition),
 Piranski dnevi arhitekture (Piran Days of Architecture) and Nagrada Piranesi (Piranesi Prize),
 Multimedijska delavnica (Multimedia Workshop) Genius Loci Lera
 Mednarodni kiparski simpozij Forma viva Portorož (International Sculpture Symposium Forma Viva Portorož)
 Other educational events, workshops and lectures.

Gallery locations
The institution encompasses the following galleries:

In Piran:
 Piran City Gallery: From 2010 till 2012, the gallery has been renovated by plans of the architect Boris Podrecca.
 Meduza 2 Gallery
 Pečarič Gallery

In Koper:
 Loža Gallery
 Meduza Gallery

In Venice:
 A+A Gallery

See also

References

External links
 Obalne galerije Piran – Gallerie Costiere Pirano
 Šola lepih podob na  preizkušnji – galerij ne delajo prostori, ampak vizije 

Art museums and galleries in Slovenia
Arts organizations established in 1974
Istria
Art museums established in 1976
1976 establishments in Slovenia